In mathematics, the Genocchi numbers Gn, named after Angelo Genocchi, are a sequence of integers  that satisfy the relation

The first few Genocchi numbers are 0, −1, −1, 0, 1, 0, −3, 0, 17 , see .

Properties 

 The generating function definition of the Genocchi numbers implies that they are rational numbers. In fact, G2n+1 = 0 for n ≥ 1 and (−1)nG2n is an odd positive integer.
 Genocchi numbers Gn are related to Bernoulli numbers Bn by the formula

Combinatorial interpretations 

The exponential generating function for the signed even Genocchi numbers (−1)nG2n is 

They enumerate the following objects:

 Permutations in S2n−1 with descents after the even numbers and ascents after the odd numbers.
 Permutations π in S2n−2 with 1 ≤ π(2i−1) ≤ 2n−2i and 2n−2i ≤ π(2i) ≤ 2n−2.
 Pairs (a1,…,an−1) and (b1,…,bn−1) such that ai and bi are between 1 and i and every k between 1 and n−1 occurs at least once among the ai's and bi's.
 Reverse alternating permutations a1 < a2 > a3 < a4 >…>a2n−1 of [2n−1] whose inversion table has only even entries.

See also 

 Euler number

References 

 
 Richard P. Stanley (1999).  Enumerative Combinatorics, Volume 2, Exercise 5.8. Cambridge University Press.  
 Gérard Viennot, Interprétations combinatoires des nombres d'Euler et de Genocchi, Seminaire de Théorie des Nombres de Bordeaux, Volume 11 (1981-1982)
 Serkan Araci, Mehmet Acikgoz, Erdoğan Şen, Some New Identities of Genocchi Numbers and Polynomials

Integer sequences
Factorial and binomial topics